The 2015 French F4 Championship season is the 23rd season of the series for 1600cc Formula Renault machinery, and the fifth season to run under the guise of the French F4 Championship. The series will begin on 19 April at Lédenon and ends on 25 October at Le Castellet, after seven rounds and twenty-one races.

Driver lineup

Race calendar and results
A seven-round calendar was published on 4 December 2014. The championship will drop Val de Vienne, Nogaro and Jerez events, while Lédenon, Hungaroring and Navarra will take their place in the series' schedule.

Championship standings

Points system
Points were awarded as follows:

French F4 Championship

The third race at Lédenon was red-flagged after less than half of the distance had been completed due to torrential rain. As a result, series organisers awarded half points to each of the classified finishers eligible to score points.

† — Drivers did not finish the race, but were classified as they completed over 75% of the race distance.

International F4 Championship

Junior F4 Championship

Notes

References

External links
 The official website of the French F4 Championship 

F4 Championship
French F4